The size of libraries in the United States is determined by a number of metrics, including number of holdings (in terms of volumes or titles held), by circulation (i.e., library materials checked out or renewed); or by number of library visits.

The largest public library in the United States and the second largest library in the world is the Library of Congress in Washington, D.C., which is the de facto national library of the United States. It holds more than 167 million items, including "more than 39 million books and other printed materials, 3.6 million recordings, 14.8 million photographs, 5.5 million maps, 8.1 million pieces of sheet music and 72 million manuscripts." The largest research library in the United States is the Harvard Library in Cambridge, Massachusetts..

Comparing the size of public libraries with research libraries (such as academic libraries) is complicated by the different definition of holdings or volumes used. The Association of Research Libraries uses the National Information Standards Organization definition of volume, which is "A single physical unit of any printed, typewritten, handwritten, mimeographed, or processed work, distinguished from other units by a separate binding, encasement, portfolio, or other clear distinction, which has been cataloged, classified, and made ready for use, and which is typically the unit used to charge circulation transactions." In contrast, the Public Library Data Service Statistical Report (a publication of the Public Library Association, which is a division of the American Library Association) defines holdings as "the number of cataloged items (number of items, number of titles) plus paperbacks and videocassettes even if uncataloged."

Largest public libraries systems by total collections
The American Library Association has published data on the size of 25 largest public libraries in the United States. These data are from the Institute of Museum and Library Services's Public Libraries Survey (PLS) for fiscal year 2016. The largest public libraries in the U.S. are far larger than the median public library in the country; almost four-fifths of U.S. public libraries serve areas with populations of fewer than 25,000.

"Total collection" consists of print material, electronic books, audio materials, and video materials, each of which is a particular "data element" defined in the PLS. Print materials include printed books, serial music, and maps, including duplicates; electronic books include digital documents include e-books and digitized documents, including duplicates; "audio materials" include both physical audio files (such as cassette tapes, audioreels, CD-ROMs, and talking books) and downloadable units; and "video materials" similarly includes both physical video materials (such as videotape and DVD) and downloadable video files.

Largest research libraries
The Association of Research Libraries (ARL), a consortium of U.S. and Canada research libraries, reports statistical data on its 124 members (of which 114 are academic libraries within universities and 10 are non-academic research libraries). The ten non-university institutions in the ARL are the Boston Public Library, National Research Council Canada National Science Library, Center for Research Libraries, Library of Congress, National Agricultural Library, National Archives, National Library of Medicine, New York Public Library, New York State Library, and Smithsonian Libraries.

The following volume figures for the largest 20 U.S. and Canada research libraries by volume were reported in ARL Statistics, 2020, published in 2022. Some ARL member libraries include the holdings of law libraries, medical libraries, and branch campuses in their reported statistics; others do not.

25 largest research libraries by volumes held
The following are the 25 ARL members with the largest number of volumes held. ARL uses the ANSI/NISO Z39.7-2004 definition of "volume": "a single physical unit of any printed, typewritten, handwritten, mimeographed, or processed work, distinguished from other units by a separate binding, encasement, portfolio, or other clear distinction, which has been catalogued, classified, and made ready for use." Microform, maps, and "electronic serials and other virtual serial volumes" are excluded from the volume count.

25 largest research libraries by titles held
The following are the 25 ARL members with the largest number of titles held, "including catalogued, locally digitized, and licensed" titles. ARL follows the ANSI/NISO Z39.7-2004 definition of "title": "The designation of a separate bibliographic whole, whether issued in one or several volumes...Titles are defined according to the Anglo-American Cataloging Rules. A book or serial title may be distinguished from other titles by its unique International Standard Book Number (ISBN) or International Standard Serial Number (ISSN)." Multiple copies of the same work (for example, subscriptions to the same publication) are counted as a single title, but a serial title available in multiple formats (for example, print and online) are counted once for each available format.

See also 
 Books in the United States
 List of largest libraries
University libraries in the United States

Footnotes

References 

 
American Library Association
Largest
Libraries
Libraries, largest